Aethes louisiana is a species of moth of the family Tortricidae. It is found in the United States, where it has been recorded from Missouri, Illinois and Indiana.

The forewings are light shining straw coloured, overlaid with golden yellow and with two dark golden brown fasciae at the base. The hindwings are dark fuscous. Adults are on wing from May to June.

References

louisiana
Moths described in 1907
Moths of North America